Diphenyl sulfone is an organosulfur compound with the formula (C6H5)2SO2. It is a white solid that is soluble in organic solvents. It is used as a high temperature solvent.  Such high temperature solvents are useful for processing highly rigid polymers, e.g., PEEK, which only dissolve in very hot solvents.

It is produced by the sulfonation of benzene with sulfuric acid and oleum.  For typical processes, benzenesulfonic acid is an intermediate. It is also produced from benzenesulfonyl chloride and benzene.

References

Benzosulfones
Phenyl compounds